Wang Zhiping (born 11 December 1983) is a Chinese race walker.

Achievements

External links

1983 births
Living people
Chinese male racewalkers
Place of birth missing (living people)
21st-century Chinese people